Dear Life may refer to:

 Dear Life (book), a 2012 short story collection by Alice Munro
 Dear Life (album), a 2016 album by High Valley
 "Dear Life" (High Valley song), 2016
 "Dear Life" (Delta Goodrem song), 2016
 "Dear Life", a song by Melanie C from the album Version of Me
 "Dear Life", a song by Beck from the album Colors
 "Dear Life", a song by The Corrs from the album Jupiter Calling